KFF Vllaznia Shkodër is an Albanian women's football club based in the city of Shkodër. The club is considered by UEFA to be the successor club to Ada, who disbanded in 2013. They play their homes games at the Reshit Rusi Stadium and they compete in the Women's National Championship, where they have won the title nine consecutive times. Vllaznia is a concept in Albanian culture often translated as "brotherhood;" it refers to loyalty to one's fis (clan, tribe).

Honors
Albanian National Championship:
Winners (9): 2013–14, 2014–15, 2015–16, 2016–17, 2017–18, 2018–19, 2019–20, 2020–21, 2021–22

Albanian Women's Cup:
Winners (9): 2013–14, 2014–15, 2015–16, 2016–17, 2017–18, 2018–19, 2019–20, 2020–21, 2021-22.

Players

Current squad

Former players

  Kelly O'Brien

Record in Europe

Managers
 Fatmir Axhani & Hava Axheri (2010–2013)
 Selami Pepaj (25 June 2013– 1 June 2015)
 Nikolin Leka (1 July 2015– )

References

Association football clubs established in 2013
 
2013 establishments in Albania
Sport in Shkodër
Women's football clubs in Albania
Football clubs in Albania